Anderson is an unincorporated community in Ross County, in the U.S. state of Ohio.

History
A post office called Anderson was established in 1862, and remained in operation until 1929. Besides the post office, Anderson had a station on the Cincinnati, Hamilton and Dayton Railroad.

References

Unincorporated communities in Ross County, Ohio
Unincorporated communities in Ohio
1869 establishments in Ohio